Bozgodar-e Olya (also Romanized as Bozgodār-e ‘Olyā; also known as Bozgodār-e Bālā) is a village in Dorudfaraman Rural District, in the Central District of Kermanshah County, Kermanshah Province, Iran. In the 2006 census, its population was 445 people from 89 families.

References 

Populated places in Kermanshah County